The rising breech carbine was a Confederate weapon produced and used during the American Civil War.

External links
Antiques Site
The image of the rising breech carbine

American Civil War rifles
Weapons of the Confederate States of America